Naturally is a studio album by jazz singer and guitarist John Pizzarelli, accompanied by Martin Pizzarelli and Ken Levinsky  (pianist). Also on the album is a large horn section with Clark Terry, and his father Bucky Pizzarelli on rhythm guitar.

Track listing
"Splendid Splinter" (John Pizzarelli) - (4:01)
"I'm Confessin' (That I Love You)" (Doc Daugherty, Al J. Neiburg, Ellis Reynolds) - (3:48)
"Oh, Lady Be Good" (George Gershwin, Ira Gershwin) - (3:51)
"When I Grow Too Old to Dream" (Oscar Hammerstein II, Sigmund Romberg) - (3:30)
"Baby Medley: Gee Baby Ain't I Good to You/Baby, Baby, All the Time" (Neal Hefti, Andy Razaf, Don Redman, Bobby Troup) - (5:16)
"Seven on Charlie" (Dick Lieb, John Pizzarelli) - (3:18)
"Slappin' the Cakes on Me" (Dave Frishberg) - (3:37)
"Nuages" (Django Reinhardt) - (4:47)
"I Cried for You" (Gus Amheim, Arthur Freed, Abe Lyman) - (4:00)
"Naturally" (Ken Levinsky, John Pizzarelli, Martin Pizzarelli) - (2:51)
"You Stepped Out of a Dream" (Nacio Herb Brown, Gus Kahn) - (3:03)
"Headed Out to Vera's" (Grover Kemble, John Pizzarelli) - (2:31)
"Your Song Is With Me" (John Pizzarelli) - (5:55)

Personnel
 John Pizzarelli – vocals, guitar
 Ken Levinsky – piano
 Bucky Pizzarelli – guitar, arrangement
 Martin Pizzarelli – double bass
 Dick Lieb – conductor, arrangement
 Clark Terry – trumpet, flugelhorn
 John Frosk – trumpet
 Tony Kadleck – trumpet
 Mike Ponella – trumpet
 Bob Alexander – trombone
 Wayne Andre – trombone
 Mark Patterson – trombone
 Paul Faulise – bass trombone
 Walt Levinsky - alto saxophone 
 Frank Griffith – alto saxophone
 Harry Allen – tenor saxophone
 Scott Robinson – tenor saxophone
 Jack Stuckey – baritone saxophone
 Dom Cortese – accordion
 Joe Cocuzzo – drums
 Tony Corbiscello – drums

References

1993 albums
John Pizzarelli albums
Big band albums
Novus Records albums